Byron Randall (October 23, 1918 – August 11, 1999) was an American West Coast artist, well known for his expressionist paintings and printmaking. A contemporary of artists Pablo O'Higgins, Anton Refregier, Robert P. McChesney, Emmy Lou Packard (his second wife), and Pele de Lappe (his final companion), Randall shared their left wing politics while exploring different techniques and styles, including a vivid use of color and line.

Biography 

Born in Tacoma, Washington, Byron Theodore Randall was raised in Salem, Oregon, where he worked as a waiter, harvest hand, boxer, and cook for the Marion County jail to finance his art career. In 1939 Randall trained under Louis Bunce and Charles Val Clear at the Federal Art Project's Salem Art Center; he subsequently taught there.  When he was 20 years old, a solo show at the Whyte Gallery in Washington D.C. brought his work to the attention of Newsweek and launched his professional career. That exhibit was followed by others, over the years, in places that include Baltimore, Salem Oregon, Chicago, New York City, San Francisco, Los Angeles, Philadelphia,  Seattle, Indianapolis, Toronto, Montreal, Moscow, Edinburgh, Leeds, and Inverness (Scotland).

Randall had three wives. His first wife was Helen Nelson, a Canadian sculptor, whom he met at the Salem Art Center while attending her classes, in 1939. Nelson was brought over from New York to be the first instructor in sculpture for the blind at the Center. She sharpened his commitment to social and trade union activism, and her belief in his talent provided vital support for the fledgling artist. In 1940 they married and moved to Mexico for six months, where they had a child, Gale, and where Randall continued to develop as a painter, inspired by the vibrant landscape and people. During the Second World War years, while Randall served in the Merchant Marines, he continued to paint whenever possible. His experiences in the South Pacific influenced his preference for natural forms and bright colors.

After the war, Randall traveled to Eastern Europe, as arts correspondent for a Canadian news agency, where he witnessed and painted the post-war devastation of Yugoslavia and Poland. Randall and Helen settled in the North Beach area of San Francisco where they had a second child, Jonathan, in 1948. Five years later they left the United States for Canada, to escape McCarthyite anti-Communism; they had both been in the US Communist Party. In 1956, Helen died in a traffic accident.

Randall and his children returned to San Francisco where he subsequently married the print-maker and muralist Emmy Lou Packard. Between 1959 and 1968 Randall and Packard ran a Guest House and Art Gallery in Mendocino, California. They were political and environmental activists, involved in the campaign to protect the area from commercial despoliation and in the creation of the Peace and Freedom Party. They attended the World Congress for Peace, National Independence and General Disarmament, Helsinki, July 10–15, as U.S. Delegates.

After the end of their marriage, Randall established a guesthouse/art gallery in Tomales, California. He converted a dilapidated chicken coop to become his home and studio, in 1971. This conversion brought him national attention. So did his huge collection of potato mashers. In 1982, he married Eve Wieland, an Austrian wartime emigre. She was his wife until her death from cancer four years later.

For the last nine years of his life, Randall's partner was Pele deLappe, an artist and friend of some 50 years standing. Randall died in San Francisco on August 11, 1999, at the age of 80 after a battle with emphysema.

Career 

Randall was an expressionist whose art was strongly responsive to physical environment. Of his paintings he wrote: "the look of them might have been different if I'd grown up anywhere but in Oregon. Brilliant sunlight nursing the green valleys after a long rainy winter . . . there's a powerful bit of environment that would show in a man's work all his life. I've seen that creative communication has a vitality all its own. It's not a refuge from life, but an intensification. It's the practice of humanity. In painting I think the approach that best affirms life is expressionism, and that's why I became and am now an expressionist."

A predominantly figurative artist, Randall experimented with abstraction in the 1940s, and again in the 1980s and 1990s. Throughout his career he produced still lifes, portraits, nudes and landscapes, in oil, watercolor, gouache, pastel, and print. He also developed plaster sculpture, and three-dimensional collages on the theme of the sea (a recurrent interest). Randall's concern for social justice ran across his career. It was most explicit in art from the 30s through to the 50s, such as his 1947 'Diabolical Machines' print (held in numerous museums), his Spanish Civil War painting (at Hallie Ford Museum), and his prints of dispossessed Jews from the ghettos of Eastern Europe (at LA Museum of the Holocaust), created from firsthand observation. In the 1960s, Randall satirically explored what was for him the grotesque pageantry of US militarism, using a visual vocabulary of ghastly females, skulls and skeletons that drew upon the folk traditions of Mexican graphic art.  As a contrast, he invoked the US's own iconic imagery of liberty and democracy, embodied in Abraham Lincoln, to whom Randall dedicated a series of oil paintings spanning two decades.

Randall saw the human condition as a dynamic struggle for justice or at times simply the struggle for survival, captured in his lifelong scenes of boxers and wrestlers.  Not only human but also planetary survival struggles caught his visual imagination. The threat of nuclear apocalypse prompted a series of huge oils, titled 'Doomsday', in the late 1950s and 1960s. The Crocker Museum, the Jundt Museum, and Smith College Art Museum hold oils from this series. Randall's late works of the 1980s and 1990s deploy a personal mythology of skulls, Mickey Mouse, Lucifer, and nude articulated dolls to ponder the chaotic horrors, and surrealism, of consumer culture. 'Flotsam and Jetsam', his print series of small lino and wood cuts and related large oils, is the summation of this political exploration.

Randall's art revels in the joyful, sensuous and whimsical aspects of everyday life. It celebrates both male and female nudity, and the hedonistic satisfactions of leisure: surfing, drinking, dancing, lounging, making music. From early on, Randall's love of tools featured in his work, animating his popular 'Philo' oil series of West Coast barns, plows and shovels. Tools and vessels often make their way into his still lifes, as do nudes, who are often slyly incorporated into landscapes and still lifes. Randall saw in manual labor the affirmative potential of a non-industrialized life. This led him to unsentimental, international portraits, in paint and print, of working people, as hewers of coal and wood, house painters, diggers, laundry women, cooks, carpenters, farmhands, stevedores, sellers of bread, balloons, and chickens. The landscapes of rural Oregon, California, Hawaii, Canada, Mexico and Scotland stimulated Randall, as a watercolorist, to the use of intensely vivid colors and energetic brushstroke. Urban life also claimed his attention, from his early, gloomy cityscapes of New York, and on to 1950s scenes of Montreal and San Francisco.

Organizing, public art, and peace activity 

Randall saw printmaking as a democratic art form that had an established and international history in mass media. This drew him to Mexico's graphic arts tradition, embodied in its Taller de Gráfica Popular, associated with artists Leopoldo Mendez, Pablo O'Higgins (a close friend of Randall), Francisco Mora, and Elizabeth Catlett. In 1940, Randall worked briefly at the Taller, and he later became an Associate Member. The Taller inspired Randall to establish the co-operative Artist's Guild of San Francisco, in 1945 (serving as President). He served as treasurer of the San Francisco Art Association, and was a member of the San Francisco Artists' Council. In 1947 he was involved in forming San Francisco's Graphic Arts Workshop.  Participating artists in the Workshop were associated with the California Labor School and included Victor Arnautoff, Pele deLappe, Louise Gilbert, Lawrence Yamamoto. This leftist art circle also illustrated the 1948 Communist Manifesto in Pictures, commemorating the Manifesto's centenary with prints by Randall, Giacomo Patri, Robert McChesney, 
Hassel Smith, Louise Gilbert, Lou Jackson and Bits Hayden.

Randall's commitment to public art at times led him to murals: in the late 1940s he painted a mural for the historic Vesuvio's Café, in San Francisco's North Beach; in 1954, he painted a fresco in a Mexico City public school; in 1957 he painted a mural for the Young Men and Women's Hebrew Association, in Montreal, and in the 60s he assisted his then wife Emmy Lou Packard in creating the Chavez Student Center bas relief mural at Sproul Plaza, UC Berkeley. He also restored Pablo O'Higgins' mural, 1969, in the Honolulu ILWU headquarters. Randall joined forces with prominent artists Mark Rothko, Robert Motherwell, Charles Wilbert White, and Frank Stella, in protesting the Vietnam War. Randall's activism also led him and Packard to the Soviet Union, in 1964, where they had a show of 48 prints in Moscow's Pushkin Museum, which was featured on Soviet television. And it led him, in the mid-1970s, along with artists Mary Fuller, her husband Robert McChesney, and the Sonoma community, to protest against Christo and Jeanne-Claude's Californian Running Fence installation.

Collections 

Randall's art is in the permanent collections of 

 National Gallery of Art
 Phillips Collection
 Fine Arts Museums of San Francisco
 San Francisco Museum of Modern Art
 Albrecht-Kemper Museum of Art
 Art, Design & Architecture Museum
 Berkeley Art Museum and Pacific Film Archive
 Bolinas Art Museum
 Crocker Art Museum
 Dana–Farber Cancer Institute
 Davis Museum at Wellesley College
 Davison Art Center
 de Saisset Museum
 Fresno Art Museum
 Frost Art Museum
 Georgia Museum of Art
 Grinnell College Museum of Art
 Hallie Ford Museum of Art
 Henry Art Gallery
 Hunter Museum of American Art
 Janet Turner Print Collection and Gallery
 Jordan Schnitzer Museum of Art
 Jundt Art Museum
 Krannert Art Museum
 Long Beach Museum of Art
 Los Angeles Museum of the Holocaust
 Lucas Museum of Narrative Art
 Mariners' Museum
 Mary and Leigh Block Museum of Art
 Maryhill Museum of Art
 Middlebury College Museum of Art
 Mills College Art Museum
 Minneapolis Institute of Art
 Montefiore Medical Center
 Monterey Museum of Art
 Montreal Museum of Fine Arts
 Musée national des beaux-arts du Québec
 Museum of Northwest Art
 Museum of Sonoma County
 Oakland Museum of California
 Palm Springs Art Museum
 Pushkin Museum
 Randall Children's Hospital at Legacy Emanuel
 Riverside Art Museum
 Saint Mary's College of California
 Schneider Museum of Art
 Sidney Kimmel Comprehensive Cancer Center
 Smith College Museum of Art
 Swedish Health Services
 Triton Museum of Art
 UC Irvine Institute and Museum for California Art
 University of Michigan Museum of Art
 University of Washington
 Weatherspoon Art Museum
 and the Western Art Gallery.

Gallery

See also 
 Expressionism
 Federal Art Project
 Taller de Gráfica Popular

References

External links 
 https://web.archive.org/web/20120213230340/http://www.sonic.net/~goblin/randall.html
 http://www.aaa.si.edu/collections/interviews/oral-history-interview-byron-randall-12541
 http://www.mutualart.com/ExternalArticle/Woody-Woodpecker-Cartoons-Were-More-Subv/90001529C3B8C883

1918 births
1999 deaths
20th-century American painters
20th-century male artists
American male painters
American printmakers
Artists from Salem, Oregon
Social realist artists
American Expressionist painters
American communists
American muralists
Works Progress Administration workers
Painters from California
Artists from the San Francisco Bay Area
Federal Art Project artists
Artists from Tacoma, Washington
People from Marin County, California